Paul Gregutt is an American wine writer whose focus is the wine of Oregon and Washington. Gregutt publishes a column titled "Wine Adviser" in The Seattle Times, and contributes to publications such as Vineyard & Winery Management, Yakima Herald-Republic, the Walla Walla Union-Bulletin and the Spokane Spokesman-Review. Gregutt is the Northwest Editor for Wine Enthusiast Magazine, and has written the Pacific Northwest material of Tom Stevenson's annual Wine Report, as well as contributions to Decanter and Wine Spectator.

Gregutt has published the book Washington Wines & Wineries: the Essential Guide (2007).

See also
List of wine personalities

References

External links
Paul Gregutt official site
The Seattle Times: "Wine Adviser"

Year of birth missing (living people)
Living people
Wine critics